Ageeth Boomgaardt (born 16 November 1972) is a Dutch former field hockey defender, who played 192 international matches for the Netherlands, in which she scored 86 goals. She made her debut on 27 January 1996 in a friendly match against the United States.

References

External links
 

1972 births
Living people
Dutch female field hockey players
Olympic field hockey players of the Netherlands
Field hockey players at the 2000 Summer Olympics
Field hockey players at the 2004 Summer Olympics
Olympic bronze medalists for the Netherlands
Olympic silver medalists for the Netherlands
Sportspeople from Tilburg
Olympic medalists in field hockey
Medalists at the 2000 Summer Olympics
Medalists at the 2004 Summer Olympics
HC Den Bosch players
20th-century Dutch women
21st-century Dutch women